Ion Gîrleșteanu (born 1900, date of death unknown) was a Romanian rugby union player. He was part of the Romanian team that won the bronze medal in the rugby tournament at the 1924 Summer Olympics.

See also
 List of Olympic medalists in rugby

References

External links
 

1900 births
Year of death missing
Romanian rugby union players
Rugby union players at the 1924 Summer Olympics
Olympic rugby union players of Romania
Medalists at the 1924 Summer Olympics
Olympic bronze medalists for Romania
Place of birth missing